I Found Stella Parish is a 1935 melodrama starring Kay Francis as a beloved actress whose dark secret is revealed to the world.

Plot
In London, Stella Parish (Kay Francis) has her greatest stage triumph in a play produced and directed by Stephen Norman (Paul Lukas). However, her happiness is short-lived. She finds a man from her past in her dressing room. Determined not to submit to blackmail, she books passage back to America on an ocean liner, traveling in disguise with her young daughter Gloria (Sybil Jason) and her best friend and confidante Nana (Jessie Ralph).

Hotshot newspaper reporter Keith Lockridge (Ian Hunter) tracks them down and befriends the trio on the sea voyage. Stella hopes to lose herself among the teeming millions of New York City, but Keith "accidentally" runs into them and renews their acquaintance. As weeks pass, Stella falls in love with him. Meanwhile, Keith investigates and finds out that Stella had been an actress. When her alcoholic, jealous husband found her innocently meeting her co-star in his apartment, he shot and killed the man. Then, he maliciously implicated her in the crime. Their daughter was born in prison. When Stella was released, she set to bury her past for Gloria's sake. Finally, Stella tells Keith that she loves him and recounts her entire history. However, Keith had wired the story to his editor a few hours before. His frantic efforts to suppress the article are too late; his newspaper has published it.

When Stella is besieged by reporters, she decides to milk the situation for money she needs to take care of her child. She sends Gloria and Nana away, out of the public eye. Then, she works with a promoter to make well-paid appearances to take advantage of the scandal. Eventually, the public tires of her, and she is reduced to working in vaudeville.

At Keith's secret insistence, Stephen Norman offers her the starring role in his play, which he had shut after its one performance. She is reluctant to return to London, but cannot refuse the money. Public reaction is at first hostile, but Keith works hard writing articles to sway public opinion. On opening night, Stella refuses to go on stage, dreading her reception, but Keith shows up backstage and points out at least two in the audience who believe in her: Gloria and Nana.

Cast
 Kay Francis as Stella Parish
 Ian Hunter as Keith Lockridge
 Paul Lukas as Stephan Norman
 Sybil Jason as Gloria Parish
 Jessie Ralph as Nana
 Barton MacLane as Clifton Jeffords, Stella's husband
 Eddie Acuff as Dimmy
 Joe Sawyer as Chuck
 Walter Kingsford as Reeves, Keith's editor
 Harry Beresford as James
 Vernon Downing (uncredited)

References

External links
 
 
 
 

1935 films
American black-and-white films
Films directed by Mervyn LeRoy
1935 romantic drama films
Warner Bros. films
American romantic drama films
Films set in London
Melodrama films
1930s English-language films
1930s American films